The 62nd Filmfare Awards ceremony, presented by the Filmfare magazine, honored the best Hindi language Indian films of 2016. The ceremony was held on 14 January 2017 and was co-hosted by Shah Rukh Khan, Karan Johar and Kapil Sharma.

Ae Dil Hai Mushkil and Udta Punjab led the ceremony with 9 nominations each, followed by Kapoor & Sons and Neerja with 8 nominations each.

Neerja won 6 awards, including Best Film (Critics) (for Ram Madhvani), Best Actress (Critics) (for Sonam Kapoor) and Best Supporting Actress (for Shabana Azmi), thus becoming the most-awarded film at the ceremony.

Alia Bhatt received dual nominations for Best Actress for her performances in Dear Zindagi and Udta Punjab, winning for the latter.

Winners and nominees

Main Awards

Nominees were announced on 9 January 2017.

Critics' Awards

Best Story
 Shakun Batra & Ayesha Devitre Dhillon – Kapoor & Sons

Best Screenplay
Shakun Batra & Ayesha Devitre Dhillon – Kapoor & Sons

Best Dialogue
 Ritesh Shah – Pink

Best Cinematography
 Mitesh Mirchandani – Neerja

Best Editing
 Monisha Baldawa – Neerja

Best Costume
 Payal Saluja – Udta Punjab

Best Action
 Sham Kaushal – Dangal

Best Background Score
 Sameer Uddin – Kapoor & Sons

Best Choreography
 Adil Shaikh – ''Kar Gayi Chull'' from Kapoor & Sons

Best Visual Effects
 Red Chillies Entertainment – Fan

Best Production Design
 Aparna Sud – Neerja

Best Sound Design
 Vivek Sachidanand – Phobia

Best Debut Director
 Ashwiny Iyer Tiwari – Nil Battey Sannata

Best Short Film (People's Choice) 
 Khamakha

Best Short Film (Fiction)
Chutney

Best Short Film (Non-fiction)
 Matitali Kusti

Best Actor (Male) in a Short Film
 Manoj Bajpayee – Taandav

Best Actor (Female) in a Short Film 
 Tisca Chopra – Chutney

Filmfare Lifetime Achievement Award 
 Shatrughan Sinha

Filmfare R.D. Burman Award – New Music Talent
 Amit Mishra – "Bulleya" from Ae Dil Hai Mushkil

Most Wins 
Neerja – 6
Kapoor & Sons (Since 1921) – 5
Ae Dil Hai Mushkil, Dangal & Udta Punjab – 4

See also
 Filmfare Awards

References

External links
 Filmfare Official Website
 Filmfare Awards 2017
 Filmfare Awards 2017 Nominations
 Filmfare Awards 2017 Winners

Filmfare Awards
2017 Indian film awards